Co-founder of Jamaica AIDS Support for Life, Ian McKnight served as Executive Director for this organization from 1991 until 2002. Later he worked as Director of Targeted Interventions and Director for Social Marketing and Public Education with JASL. He then worked as Violence Prevention Specialist and Media and Communications Specialist on JA-STYLE, a USAID-funded/Ministry of Health adolescent reproductive health project.

After serving the Caribbean Vulnerable Communities Coalition (CVC) as its Programmes Manager for three years, he became its Executive Director and held that position from 2009 to 2013. He served as the delegate for Latin America and the Caribbean on UNAIDS' Project Coordinating Board (PCB) 2009–2011.
He later served the USAID COMET II Project as its Chief of Party until that project's scheduled end in 2018. Thereafter he worked with the International Planned Parenthood Federation Western Region Hemisphere Region (IPPF-WHR) as its Senior Country Advisor. Today he is the Director of Programs and Services for the Toronto People With AIDS Foundation (PWA).

As a facilitator, McKnight has served PANCAP/CARICOM's "Champion for Change" initiative and the Saint Maarten National HIV Programme's Advocacy and Policy Development Training. As a trainer, McKnight's clients include the Society Against Sexual Orientation Discrimination (SASOD, UNIFEM, Fluid Bodies Project in New York, the Caribbean HIV AIDS Alliance, Kwanza Productions, Value Added Services, Caribbean Vulnerable Communities Jamaica (CVC) and on the Curriculum Development team in conjunction with the Centre for HIV/AIDS Education Research Services (CHARES), the Pan American Health Organization (PAHO) and the American Society of Black Psychologists.

As Chairman of Partners for Community Change, McKnight focused on the external debt relief campaign for Jamaica. He also was a writer for the University of the West Indies (UWI) Masters in Counselling Programme and served as consultant to the Canadian International Development Agency's (CIDA) contract with the Mount Saint Vincent University (MSVU)and the AIDS Coalition of Nova Scotia (ACNS).

McKnight sits on the Board of organizations such as the Jamaica AIDS Support For Life (JASL) and the Caribbean Vulnerable Communities Coalition (CVC). McKnight is also the immediate past Chairman of the Civil Society Forum (CSF) of Jamaica on HIV/AIDS, which is a local coalition advocating for the greater inclusion of civil society organisation in decision making in the health sector. McKnight has also been the Producer and Executive Producer of a number of documentaries on issues of social justice and human rights for marginalised communities in the Caribbean. These include "The Cost of Hate: How Homophobia Fuels HIV"-2011, "My Body My Business"-2010. "Complex Problems: Simple Solutions"-2007, "Take a Stand: Jamaican Civil Society organises for Health"-2009, and "A Right to be: Sex Worker access to health care in the Caribbean"-2009.

He has also been a member of:- (1) the Caribbean Treatment Action Group (CTAG), a Caribbean regional group of HIV/AIDS activist committed to access to treatment and literacy for persons living with HIV or AIDS in the Caribbean. (2) the Caribbean Sex Work Coalition (CSWC) which is lobbying for, among other things, the legalization of sex work and (3) the Caribbean Coalition of Women, Girls & AIDS (CCWA) which advocates for gender balance and the rights of women and girls. He has been a presenter at the International AIDS Conferences in Mexico and Vienna, Austria and Washington, DC in 2008, 2010 & 2012 respectively and the Caribbean HIV Conference in Nassau, Bahamas in 2011.

McKnight attended the University of the West Indies where he attained a Bachelor in Theology and a Masters in Communication for Social and Behaviour. McKnight also holds a Masters in Human Resource Management Nova Southeastern University. 		
In 2004, McKnight received the Gleaner Company award for excellence in Health, for work with Jamaica AIDS Support for Life. He also won the Governor General's award for un-sung heroes for Kingston and St. Andrew in 2006.

References

External links
Jamaica AIDS Support For Life
Caribbean Vulnerable Communities Coalition

Jamaican activists
Jamaican chief executives
Corporate executives
University of the West Indies alumni
Nova Southeastern University alumni
Living people
Year of birth missing (living people)